The 1992 Australia rugby union tour of Europe, also known as the 1992 Wallabies Spring tour, was a series of matches played in Ireland, Wales and England in October and November 1992 by the Australia national rugby union team.

Results 
Scores and results list Australia's points tally first.

 

1992 rugby union tours
1992
1992–93 in European rugby union
1992–93 in Welsh rugby union
1992–93 in Irish rugby union
1992–93 in English rugby union
Europe
1992
1992
1992